Norbert Kovács may refer to:

 Norbert Kovács (footballer)
 Norbert Kovács (swimmer)